Costas Los (born 31 January 1955) is a Greek former racing driver.

Racing record

Complete 24 Hours of Le Mans results

References

1955 births
Living people
Greek racing drivers
IMSA GT Championship drivers
24 Hours of Le Mans drivers
Deutsche Tourenwagen Masters drivers
World Sportscar Championship drivers

Graff Racing drivers
Ecurie Ecosse drivers